The Cornish & Devon Post is a weekly newspaper, published in Launceston, Cornwall, England, which was launched in 1856.  It was one of the last newspapers in the UK to carry advertisements, rather than news on the front page. It is owned by the Tindle Newspaper Group since 1986.

It covers the main towns of Launceston, Bude, Holsworthy and Camelford and the area of northwest Devon and northeast Cornwall. 

In April 2020, after 164 years, the paper made the switch from broadsheet to tabloid, with news appearing on the front page for the first time.

References

External links

 Cornish & Devon Post website

Newspapers published in Cornwall
Publications established in 1856
1856 establishments in England
Newspapers published in Devon
Launceston, Cornwall